Alexis James Oliver FitzGerald (4 September 1916 – 16 June 1985) was a Fine Gael politician and one of the founding Partners of the Irish law firm McCann FitzGerald.

He was married to Grace Costello, daughter of Ida Mary Costello and John A. Costello, Fine Gael leader and Taoiseach. He was elected in 1969 to the 12th Seanad Éireann on the Industrial and Commercial Panel, and re-elected in 1973 and 1977. He retired from politics at the 1981 Seanad election, and his nephew Alexis FitzGerald Jnr was elected to the 15th Seanad, again by the Industrial and Commercial Panel.

He lectured in economics at University College Dublin and from 1981–82, he was a special adviser to Taoiseach Garret FitzGerald (no relation). Alexis FitzGerald is buried in Glasnevin Cemetery.

McCann FitzGerald
In 1947 FitzGerald was one of the founding partners of the Dublin solicitors' firm, McCann White & FitzGerald, now known as McCann FitzGerald, one of Ireland's largest law firms. He was the practice's senior partner until his death in 1985.

References

External links
History of McCann FitzGerald Solicitors

Bibliography
Lynch, Patrick and James Meenan (editors) (1987). Essays in Memory of Alexis FitzGerald, Dublin: The Incorporated Law Society of Ireland. 

1916 births
1985 deaths
Fine Gael senators
Members of the 12th Seanad
Members of the 13th Seanad
Members of the 14th Seanad
Burials at Glasnevin Cemetery
Politicians from Dublin (city)
20th-century Irish lawyers
Lawyers from Dublin (city)